Tarwin is a small town located in the South Gippsland Shire, in Victoria, Australia.

References

Towns in Victoria (Australia)